Arena Academy is a coeducational secondary school located in the Perry Beeches area of Birminghamin the West Midlands of England.

Previously a community school administered by Birmingham City Council, Perry Beeches School converted to academy status on 3 May 2012 and was renamed Perry Beeches The Academy.

On 14 July 2017, Kevin Rogers of Perry Beeches 2 announced to students that Perry Beeches The Academy was going to leave Perry Beeches The Academy Trust and would change to a new trust and would change uniform and name. The school joined CORE Education Trust and was renamed Arena Academy.

The school offers GCSEs and BTECs as programmes of study for pupils.

Perry Beeches The Academy Trust
Perry Beeches The Academy was formerly the lead school of Perry Beeches The Academy Trust and before that Perry Beeches Secondary School, a multi-academy trust which was formed of Perry Beeches The Academy, Perry Beeches II The Free School, Perry Beeches III The Free School, Perry Beeches IV The Free School and Perry Beeches V The All Through Family School. Together the schools offered a combined sixth form provision.

In May 2013, Education Secretary Michael Gove officially opened Perry Beeches II The Free School,
and in September 2013, Prime Minister David Cameron visited Perry Beeches III The Free School shortly after it had opened.

In March 2016 the Education Funding Agency published a critical report on the financial management and governance of the Trust. The report showed that the chief executive of the Trust, Liam Nolan, was being paid by sub-contractors as well as by the Trust. In addition more than £2.5 million of free school meal funding could not be checked because financial records had been deleted, that £1.3 million had been paid to a sub-contractor without a written contract or after a formal procurement exercise, and there was not effective oversight by trustees. In April 2016 the Education Funding Agency started investigating additional allegations.

In May 2016 it was announced that the chief executive of the trust, Liam Nolan had resigned, as well as the trust’s entire governing board. The five academies and free schools that were formerly part of the trust were then administered directly by the Department for Education until a new sponsor could be found for the schools. The trust had a debt of £2.1 million, and was running at a significant deficit.

Perry Beeches III was put in special measures in October 2015 by Ofsted, and in November 2016 the academy trust was rated "inadequate".

References

External links
Arena Academy website
 

Secondary schools in Birmingham, West Midlands
Academies in Birmingham, West Midlands